Thairo Jose Estrada Villegas (born February 22, 1996) is a Venezuelan professional baseball infielder for the San Francisco Giants of Major League Baseball (MLB). Estrada signed with the New York Yankees as an international free agent in 2012. He was a 2015 New York-Pennsylvania League Mid-Season All Star, and a 2017 Eastern League Mid-Season and Post-Season All Star. He was shot in early 2018 by robbers, with his recovery delaying the start of his season, in which he played with a bullet still lodged in his hip.  He has previously played in MLB for the Yankees, with whom he made his MLB debut in 2019.

Career

New York Yankees

2012-17
Estrada signed with the New York Yankees as an international free agent in August 2012 for $49,000. He made his professional debut in 2013 with the Rookie League Gulf Coast Yankees, and spent the whole season there, batting .278/.350/.432 with five triples, two home runs, 8 hit by pitch, and 17 runs batted in (RBIs) in 176 at bats over 50 games. The 17-year-old was one of the youngest players in the Gulf Coast League, 2.6 years younger than the average player in the league. Baseball America rated him the 20th-best player in the league.

He played 2014 with the Gulf Coast Yankees and the Class A- Staten Island Yankees (and was 3.0 years younger than the average New York-Pennsylvania League player). Estrada batted a combined .272/.337/.309 in 81 at bats over 23 games, with his season cut short by a leg injury he suffered while running the bases in July.

Estrada played in 2015 with Staten Island. He slashed .267/.338/.360 with two home runs and 23 RBIs in 247 at bats over 63 games, and was named a New York-Pennsylvania League Mid-Season All Star.

He then played in 2016 for the Class A Charleston RiverDogs of the South Atlantic League and the Class A+ Tampa Yankees of the Florida State League (where Estrada was 2.8 years younger than the average player in the league). He batted a combined .290/.346/.391 with eight home runs, 49 RBIs, and a career-high 18 stolen bases in 495 at bats over 118 total games between the two teams, and was named an MiLB Organization All Star.

Estrada spent 2017 with the Class AA Trenton Thunder, and was 3.2 years younger than the average player in the Eastern League. He batted .301(6th in the Eastern League)/.353/.392 with 72 runs (3rd), four triples (7th), six home runs, nine hit-by-pitch (6th), and 48 RBIs in 495 at bats over 122 games, with a low strikeout rate of 10.3%. At 21 years and two months of age, he was the 7th-youngest player to make a 2017 Eastern League Opening Day roster.  He was named an Eastern League Mid-Season All Star and Post-Season All Star, and an MiLB Organization All Star. After the regular season, the Yankees added Estrada to their 40-man roster. He then played for the Scottsdale Scorpions of the Arizona Fall League, batting .342/.381/.430 in 79 at bats. He was named to the AFL All-Prospect Team, and named an AFL Rising Star. Baseball America rated him the Yankees' # 9 prospect.  MLB.com rated him the Yankees' # 8 prospect, and assessed his defense as follows: "there's no question that Estrada is a big league shortstop. He covers a lot of ground thanks to his smooth actions and keen instincts, and he has the plus arm to make all of the throws. He's also an asset at second and third base, and he's athletic enough to handle the outfield if asked."

2018-19
In January 2018, while in his hometown in Venezuela, Estrada was shot in his right hip by robbers in a robbery attempt. Doctors in Venezuela who performed surgery upon him were unable to remove the bullet from his hip, but he was cleared to play with the small caliber bullet lodged in his hip; it was only removed in July six months later, in the United States.

After a delayed start to his season as he missed spring training, Estrada suffered a season-ending lower back injury in June 2018. He played in 18 regular season games in the minor leagues for Tampa and the Class AAA Scranton/Wilkes-Barre RailRiders of the International League (where he was 4.5 years younger than the average player) combined, batting .192/.210/.231 in 78 at bats. He played for the Glendale Desert Dogs of the Arizona Fall League after the regular season, batting .238/.282/.263 in 80 at bats.

The Yankees promoted Estrada to the major leagues on April 4, 2019, but optioned him back to Scranton/Wilkes-Barre on April 6 without Estrada appearing in a major league game. He was again promoted to the Yankees on April 21, and made his major league debut that day. He laid down a sacrifice bunt that set up a walk-off single by Austin Romine. He recorded his first two major league hits on April 23. In 64 at bats for the Yankees he batted .250/.294/.438. For the Yankees he played 17 games at second base, 9 at shortstop, and 2 each in left field and right field. In AAA he batted .266/.313/.452 with 8 home runs in 241 at bats, playing 33 games at shortstop, 24 at second base, and 2 at third base.

In his minor league career through 2019, Estrada had played 225 games at shortstop, 161 games at second base, and 52 games at third base.

2020-21
In 2020 for the Yankees, Estrada batted .167/.231/.229 with one home run and three RBIs in 48 at bats across 26 games, playing 20 games at second base, 6 games at third base, and 3 games at shortstop.

On April 6, 2021, Estrada was designated for assignment following the acquisition of Rougned Odor.

San Francisco Giants

2021
On April 11, 2021, the Yankees traded Estrada to the San Francisco Giants in exchange for cash considerations. Estrada played first for the Class AAA Sacramento River Cats of the Triple-A West, and batted .385 (4th in the league at the time of his call-up)/.448(9th)/.609 with 12 doubles (10th) in 156 at bats, while striking out only 14% of the time.  He played 26 games at shortstop, 7 at second base, 2 at third base, and one in left field.

He was called up to the Giants on June 6, following an injury to third baseman Evan Longoria who had collided with shortstop Brandon Crawford. In Estrada's debut with the Giants on July 2 against the Arizona Diamondbacks, he went 3-5 with 5 RBIs, a double, and a grand slam. Crawford's oblique injury in July shifted Estrada to start at shortstop in his place.

In the 2021 regular season for the Giants, Estrada batted .273/.333/.479 with 7 home runs and 22 RBIs in 121 at bats. He played 19 games at shortstop, 16 games at second base, 4 games at third base, 4 games in left field, and one game in right field. At AAA Sacramento, he batted .333/.399/.538 with 9 home runs and 40 RBIs in 210 at bats.

2022
In 2022 Estrada batted .260/.322/.402 with 71 runs, 14 home runs, 62 RBIs, 21 stolen bases (7th in the NL) in 27 attempts, 5.5 at bats per strikeout (8th), and 14 hit by pitch (7th), and had the fastest sprint speed of all Giants players, at 28.3 feet per second. On defense he had a range factor/9Inn at 2B of 4.22 (3rd). On January 13, 2023, Estrada agreed to a one-year, $2.25 million contract with the Giants for the 2023 season, avoiding salary arbitration.

Personal life
In January 2018, Estrada was shot in his right hip/thigh by a pair of teenagers in a robbery attempt in his hometown of Bejuma in Venezuela, while he and his wife were in a cafe and he was at the counter. The bullet was not removed until six months later, in July 2018 in a hospital in Tampa, Florida. He said, "The situation [in Venezuela] is not very good, not very safe... it makes you think about [not] even going back anymore."

Estrada and his wife have a son.

References

External links

1996 births
Living people
Charleston RiverDogs players
Glendale Desert Dogs players
Gulf Coast Yankees players
Major League Baseball second basemen
Major League Baseball shortstops
New York Yankees players
People from Carabobo
San Francisco Giants players
Scottsdale Scorpions players
Scranton/Wilkes-Barre RailRiders players
Shooting survivors
Staten Island Yankees players
Tampa Tarpons players
Tampa Yankees players
Trenton Thunder players
Venezuelan expatriate baseball players in the United States
Sacramento River Cats players